I Might Be Dead by Tomorrow (lit. "As Long As I Have Breath in My Body") is a Canadian documentary film, directed by Steve Patry and released in 2020. The film is a portrait of homelessness in Montreal, profiling both homeless people and the front-line workers who try to help them.

The film premiered on September 19, 2020 at the Quebec City Film Festival.

The film received a Prix Iris nomination for Best Documentary Film at the 23rd Quebec Cinema Awards in 2021, as well as being listed as a nominee for the Public Prize.

Natalie Lamoureux received a Canadian Screen Award nomination for Best Editing in a Documentary at the 10th Canadian Screen Awards in 2022.

References

External links

2020 films
2020 documentary films
Canadian documentary films
Quebec films
Documentary films about homelessness in Canada
2020s Canadian films